Ray Santilli (born 30 September 1958) is a British musician, record and film producer. He is best known for his exploitation in 1995 of the controversial "alien autopsy" footage and subject of the Warner Bros. film Alien Autopsy.

Early life
Born in London, Santilli  was the son of Italian immigrants. He spent his childhood in Islington London.

Career
Ray Santilli started his professional career in 1974 as a session musician, record producer and music distributor. In 1982, Santilli founded AMP Entertainment, where he produced and promoted acts of the day.

In 1981, Santilli produced The Tweets album which featured "The Birdy Song". In 1985 he founded Music Broadcasting Services Ltd, an independent record label which handled the exclusive rights to the Walt Disney Audio Soundtrack Catalogue in the United Kingdom.

In 1987 Santilli produced the charity record "The Wishing Well" featuring Boy George, Dollar and Grace Kennedy  for Great Ormond Street Hospital. In 1991, Santilli founded the Merlin Group. The company specialised in the re-recording of hits with original artists. Merlin also produced and marketed a number of television specials. In 1994 Santilli formed Orbital Media Ltd where he produced a succession of TV documentaries and films for television.

Santilli is best known for his claim to have discovered footage which depicted the autopsy of an alien creature. The Alien autopsy footage, supposedly of extraterrestrial corpses from the so-called Roswell UFO incident, was broadcast to a worldwide audience on 28 August 1995. The film and those who took part in the making of it have all admitted it is a hoax, although Santilli still maintains it is real despite him changing his story numerous times. He also claims Kodak have analysed the film and confirmed its date, but when asked to resubmit the film with the images, Santilli has always refused.

In 2006 the story of Ray Santilli and the autopsy was the subject of a Warner Bros. film Alien Autopsy featuring the British double act Ant & Dec. Dec plays Ray Santilli with Ant as Santilli's real life business partner and friend Gary Shoefield. That same year, Ray Santilli claimed that sections of the autopsy footage had been 'restored'.

Filmography

References

External links

Interview with Ray Santilli
My Story by Ray Santilli

1957 births
British male guitarists
British record producers
British film producers
Musicians from London
English people of Italian descent
Living people